The Battle of the Buliok Complex took place on 11 February 2003 in an area within the provinces of Maguindanao and Cotabato in Mindanao, Philippines. The 60-hectare complex, which stretches from Pikit, Cotabato to Pagalungan, Maguindanao, was a stronghold of the Muslim separatist Moro Islamic Liberation Front (MILF). Accused by the Philippine government of harboring members of Pentagon, a notorious kidnap-for-ransom gang operating in Mindanao, the MILF was attacked in the Buliok complex by the Armed Forces of the Philippines under orders from then-President Gloria Macapagal Arroyo.

Background

After losing their camps, foremost of which was Camp Abubakar, due to the "all-out-war" policy of then-President Joseph Estrada in 2000, the MILF withdrew into the areas around the Liguasan Marsh. The Buliok Complex (called the Buliok Islamic Center or the Buliok Mosque by the MILF) encompasses areas where the boundaries of Maguindanao, Cotabato and Sultan Kudarat meet. It was within this complex that the MILF re-established their presence.

The battle
The Philippine government commenced military operations against the MILF on the day Eid al-Adha was being celebrated, tactically reasoning that the MILF forces would be vulnerable to attack. The government at first would not state the reason for the attack on the complex; later it would admit that the main objective was the MILF itself, in order for the government to maintain the dominant position in the conflict. Jesus Dureza, chairman of the government panel during peace talks with the MILF during this time, is on record stating that the attack on the Buliok complex came after the government failed to forge a ceasefire agreement with the MILF.

Aftermath
The Buliok complex was captured by government forces on 13 February 2003. A month after, the MILF attempted to retake their lost stronghold in an offensive that resulted in the deaths of 68-200 of their members. During this period, the Armed Forces of the Philippines and the MILF exchanged widely-conflicting casualty reports. Government military officials commented on how "youthful-looking" the slain MILF fighters were; Mohagher Iqbal, then-spokesman of the MILF central committee, admitted that some of their fighters were "able-bodied teenagers" who voluntarily joined the MILF.

Salamat Hashim, the founder of the Moro Islamic Liberation Front, died by year's end.

See also
2000 Philippine campaign against the Moro Islamic Liberation Front
Bangsamoro peace process

References

2003 in the Philippines
History of Cotabato
History of Maguindanao del Sur
Moro conflict
February 2003 events in the Philippines